Calonectria kyotensis is a fungal plant pathogen.  It is known to affect harvested durians, including from Durio graveolens and D. kutejensis.

References

External links
 Index Fungorum
 USDA ARS Fungal Database

Fungal plant pathogens and diseases
Nectriaceae
Fungi described in 1892